Moustafa Ali Abdel Halim (born 1 November 1943) is an Egyptian weightlifter. He competed in the 1976 Summer Olympics.

References

1943 births
Living people
Weightlifters at the 1976 Summer Olympics
Egyptian male weightlifters
Olympic weightlifters of Egypt